Hongcheng Stadium (Simplified Chinese: 弘诚体育场) is a multi-purpose stadium in Qingdao, China. It is currently used mostly for football matches. The stadium holds 14,000 people. The stadium was built in 1999.

See also
 Sports in China

References

Buildings and structures in Qingdao
Football venues in Qingdao
Sport in Qingdao
Multi-purpose stadiums in China
Sports venues in Shandong
Sports venues completed in 1999
1999 establishments in China